PS Pidie Jaya or Persatuan Sepakbola Pidie Jaya (en: Football Association of Pidie Jaya) is an Indonesian football club based in Pidie Jaya Regency, Aceh. They compete in Liga 3.

Honours 
 ISC Liga Nusantara Aceh
 Winners (1): 2016

References

External links
Liga-Indonesia.co.id

Football clubs in Indonesia
Football clubs in Aceh